Dickson Marwa Mkami (born 9 March 1982 in Tarime District, Mara Region) is a Tanzanian long-distance runner. He competes in both track and road running. He represented Tanzania at the 2006 Commonwealth Games and the 2008 Olympic Games. He is the Tanzanian record holder for the half marathon with his best of 59:52 minutes.

He finished sixteenth over 10,000 metres at the 2007 World Championships in Athletics and was also seventh at the 2007 IAAF World Road Running Championships that year. He was fourteenth on the track at the Beijing Olympics and finished sixteenth for a second time at the 2009 World Championships in Athletics.

He is a two-time winner of the Sydney City2Surf and the Bridge to Brisbane, having won both the races in 2006 and 2007. He took part in the Ras Al Khaimah Half Marathon in 2008 and finished in third. Marwa won the Prague 10K in 2009 and was runner-up at the event the following year. He took fourth place at the Portugal Half Marathon in 2010, finishing with a time of 1:03:14. He finished in the top ten of his first race of 2011, the Ras Al Khaimah Half Marathon. He was sixth at the Marseille-Cassis Classic later that year.

Achievements

Personal bests
1500 metres – 3:44.16 min (2005)
3000 metres – 7:43.01 min (2007)
5000 metres – 13:25.18 min (2007)
10,000 metres – 27:38.58 min (2007)
10 kilometres – 27:54	min (2007)
Half marathon – 59:52 min (2008)
Marathon – 2:12:53 hrs (2003)

References

External links



1982 births
Living people
Tanzanian male long-distance runners
Tanzanian male marathon runners
Olympic athletes of Tanzania
Commonwealth Games competitors for Tanzania
Athletes (track and field) at the 2008 Summer Olympics
Athletes (track and field) at the 2006 Commonwealth Games
People from Mara Region
Tanzanian male cross country runners
Athletes (track and field) at the 2007 All-Africa Games
African Games competitors for Tanzania